The 2019–20 Liga IV Caraș-Severin was the 52nd season of Liga IV Caraș-Severin, the fourth tier of the Romanian football league system. The season is scheduled began on 7 September 2019  and was scheduled to end in June 2020, but was suspended in March because of the COVID-19 pandemic in Romania. The season was ended officially on 20 July 2020 and Progresul Ezeriș was crowned as county champion.

Team changes

To Liga IV Caraș-Severin
Relegated from Liga III
 —
Promoted from Liga V Caraș-Severin
 Bistra Glimboca
 Steaua Prigor

From Liga IV Caraș-Severin
Promoted to Liga III
 —
Relegated to Liga V Caraș-Severin
 —

Other changes
 Viitorul Caransebeș  withdrew from Liga IV.
 Magica Caransebeș, Era S Comexim Caransebeș, Ad Mediam Mehadia and Agmonia Zăvoi were enrolled in Liga IV due to the lack of teams.

Competition format
The league consists of 18 teams divided into two zones of 9 teams, Oravița Zone and Caransebeș Zone. The first two ranked teams in each zones will qualify for championship play-off and the winner will participate for promotion play-off to Liga III.

League tables

Oravița Zone

Caransebeș Zone

Promotion play-off

Champions of Liga IV – Caraș-Severin County face champions of Liga IV – Arad County and Liga IV – Gorj County.

Region 4 (West)

Group A

See also

Main Leagues
 2019–20 Liga I
 2019–20 Liga II
 2019–20 Liga III
 2019–20 Liga IV

County Leagues (Liga IV series)

 2019–20 Liga IV Alba
 2019–20 Liga IV Arad
 2019–20 Liga IV Argeș
 2019–20 Liga IV Bacău
 2019–20 Liga IV Bihor
 2019–20 Liga IV Bistrița-Năsăud
 2019–20 Liga IV Botoșani
 2019–20 Liga IV Brăila
 2019–20 Liga IV Brașov
 2019–20 Liga IV Bucharest
 2019–20 Liga IV Buzău
 2019–20 Liga IV Călărași
 2019–20 Liga IV Cluj
 2019–20 Liga IV Constanța
 2019–20 Liga IV Covasna
 2019–20 Liga IV Dâmbovița
 2019–20 Liga IV Dolj
 2019–20 Liga IV Galați 
 2019–20 Liga IV Giurgiu
 2019–20 Liga IV Gorj
 2019–20 Liga IV Harghita
 2019–20 Liga IV Hunedoara
 2019–20 Liga IV Ialomița
 2019–20 Liga IV Iași
 2019–20 Liga IV Ilfov
 2019–20 Liga IV Maramureș
 2019–20 Liga IV Mehedinți
 2019–20 Liga IV Mureș
 2019–20 Liga IV Neamț
 2019–20 Liga IV Olt
 2019–20 Liga IV Prahova
 2019–20 Liga IV Sălaj
 2019–20 Liga IV Satu Mare
 2019–20 Liga IV Sibiu
 2019–20 Liga IV Suceava
 2019–20 Liga IV Teleorman
 2019–20 Liga IV Timiș
 2019–20 Liga IV Tulcea
 2019–20 Liga IV Vâlcea
 2019–20 Liga IV Vaslui
 2019–20 Liga IV Vrancea

References

External links
 Official website 

Liga IV seasons
Sport in Caraș-Severin County